is a railway station on the Minobu Line of Central Japan Railway Company (JR Central) located in the town of Nanbu, Minamikoma District, Yamanashi Prefecture, Japan.

Lines
Utsubuna Station is served by the Minobu Line and is located 34.1 kilometers from the southern terminus of the line at Fuji Station.

Layout
Utsubuna Station has a single island platform, with a two-story concrete station building containing a waiting room. The station is unattended.

Platform

Adjacent stations

History
The station was renamed to its present name on October 1, 1938. The line came under control of the Japanese Government Railways on May 1, 1941. The JGR became the JNR (Japan National Railway) after World War II. The current station building was completed in March 1967. Along with the division and privatization of JNR on April 1, 1987, the station came under the control and operation of the Central Japan Railway Company.

Surrounding area
 Fuji River
Nanbu Junior High School

See also
 List of railway stations in Japan

External links

 Minobu Line station information	 

Railway stations in Japan opened in 1918
Railway stations in Yamanashi Prefecture
Minobu Line
Nanbu, Yamanashi